Neza Patricia Masozera,(born 23 December 1984) better known by her stage name Neza, is a Rwandan-Canadian based afropop singer. In 2017, she was awarded as the "Most Promising Artist in Africa" by All Africa Music Awards.

Early
Neza Lost her father at an early age and was raised by her widowed mother. Due to famine in their home country, Democratic Republic of the Congo, the family moved to Rwanda in 1995. Three years later, the family relocated to Toronto, Canada as a result of her sister's desire to provide a better and more secure life for her.

Career
Neza started music early 2000, and since then taken off, which developed into the eclectic talent that is before us today.
In winter 2010, Neza released a 7 track EP entitled 'Brand New', which featured the single 'Go Gettaz'. The track was also featured on DJ Charlie Brown's r&b mixtape 'Brown Billz – R&B Edition'.
Her remix video for French Montana's 'Pop That' released September 2012, generated 2000+  views in the first 3 weeks and was aired on national television in Rwanda.
In 2017, Neza relocated to Lagos, Nigeria, and got signed by Nigerian Singer, Mc Galaxy to his label, MCG Empire.
Neza released three singles (Uranyica, Shaba & Vibe) under the label. She also featured on Nigerian artist Skales' Album two singles "Gbe" and "Good Life"

Discography
Singles
 My Baby  ft MC Galaxy  
 Shabba
 Vibe ft MC Galaxy 
 Slay Mama  
 Only God Knows
As featured artist
 Deejay Pius - "Tempramido" feat. Mc Galaxy & Neza
 MC Galaxy – "Snapchat" feat. Neza, Kelly Pyle & Musicman TY
 MC Galaxy ft Neza - Jacurb Dance

Awards

Won
 2012 African Entertainment Awards, Canada - Best Female Artist of the Year
 2017  All Africa Music Awards - Most Promising Artiste in Africa

Nominations
 2018  All Africa Music Awards  - Best Female Artiste in Eastern African

References

External links 

Living people
1984 births
Rwandan women singers